Rickenella is a genus of brightly colored bryophilous agarics in the Hymenochaetales that have an omphalinoid morphology. They inhabit mosses on mossy soils, peats, tree trunks and logs in temperate regions of both the Northern and Southern Hemispheres. Phylogenetically related agarics are in the genera Contumyces, Gyroflexus, Loreleia, Cantharellopsis and Blasiphalia, as well as the stipitate-stereoid genera Muscinupta and  Cotylidia. and the clavarioid genus, Alloclavaria.

Rickenella is most similar to Contumyces and Blasiphalia, from the former differing by having its cystidia on the cap, stipe, and hymenium solitary and scattered. The hair-like cystidia on the cap and stipe give the small mushrooms a fuzzy appearance when viewed through a magnifying glass or hand lens. This helps to distinguish the genus from genera like Loreleia, which can be orange colored and inhabits similar sites, as well as other brightly pigmented omphalinoid genera. Rickenella does not produce massive clasping, hand-like appressoria on the rhizoids of its host, as does Blasiphalia. Instead, Rickenella produces a small appressorium or no appressoria and penetrates the rhizoids of its moss hosts, growing within the cells.

Blasiphalia is a recent segregate of Rickenella.

Etymology
Rickenella was named after the German mycologist Adalbert Ricken, author of "Die Blätterpilze (Agaricaceae) (1915) Deutschlands und der angrenzenden Länder, besonders Oesterreichs und der Schweiz".

References

External links
Mykoweb
Photo of R. fibula
Mushroom Expert

Agaricomycetes genera
Repetobasidiaceae